Milino is a village in the municipality of Lozovo, North Macedonia.

Demographics
According to the 2002 census, the village had a total of 334 inhabitants. Ethnic groups in the village include:

Macedonians 237
Turks 21
Serbs 2
Aromanians 1
Albanians 35
Bosniaks 34
Others 4

References

Villages in Lozovo Municipality
Albanian communities in North Macedonia